The 1913–14 Army Cadets men's ice hockey season was the 11th season of play for the program.

Season
For the 1914 season, Army played a much tougher schedule than previous years. As a result, the team posted one of the worst records in team history, winning just one game against a secondary school.

Roster

Standings

Schedule and results

|-
!colspan=12 style=";" | Regular Season

 † Army records indicate a 1–0 win, however, contemporary news reports have Cornell winning 5–1.
 ‡ Army records indicate a 3–5 loss, however, contemporary news reports have Princeton winning 5–0.

References

Army Black Knights men's ice hockey seasons
Army
Army
Army
Army